Robin Hoffmann (born 18 February 1984) is a German composer, orchestrator and arranger.

Life
Robin Hoffmann was born on 18 February 1984 in Großenhain, in the former German Democratic Republic.

At the age of 7, he began playing the piano, starting to write first compositions at the age of 11. As part of his A-level exams he wrote a composition for symphonic orchestra which got performed by the Neue Elbland Philharmonie in 2001 under Peter Fanger.

After graduating from school he began writing music for amateur film groups, film students and computer game projects.

From 2004–2008 he attended the Hochschule für Musik Carl Maria von Weber where he studied composition, arrangement and piano under Rainer Lischka, Marko Lackner, Lars Juling, Clemens Kühn and Jochen Aldinger.

While still studying he was commissioned to write the orchestral music for the Swiss/UK film production Save Angel Hope. From 2010-2015 he teamed up with Swiss composer Moritz Schneider and founded the music composition and production company "Nachos and Cheese", specialized in writing and producing music for media. In 2009, they were commissioned to write the music for the Musical "Dällebach Kari" which had its premiere in 2010 at the Thuner Seespiele in Thun, Switzerland and was well received by the public and critics.

Since 2015, Hoffmann has been working independently as composer, orchestrator and arranger. Besides his work for film and game scores he wrote orchestral arrangements for Gary Barlow, Ronan Keating, Sophie Ellis-Bextor, Bonnie Tyler, Matthias Schweighöfer and other international artists. He worked on the music for commercial campaigns for Australian Open, Steggles, Salvation Army, Air New Zealand, Mobiliar und John West and others.

Besides his work for film, musicals and media, Robin has been writing concert music for ensembles and artists. He has worked with the London Symphony Orchestra which recorded his Violin Concerto for Anna Karkowska in Abbey Road Studios conducted by Benjamin Wallfisch in 2010. Furthermore he worked with the WDR Funkhausorchester, Staatskapelle Weimar, Bratislava Symphony Orchestra, City of Prague Philharmonic Orchestra, Tokyo Studio Symphony Orchestra, Brandenburgischen Staatsorchester Frankfurt (Oder) and other renowned orchestras.

Notable compositions

Film scores
 Treasure Trackers (2023)
 Suzume no tojimari (Orchestrations) (2022)
 The Magic Flute (Orchestrations) (2022)
 Star Wars Visions (Orchestrations) (2021)
 A Father's Job (2020)
 In Love and War (2018)
 Hero (2017)
 Recycling Lily (2013)
 Liebling, lass uns scheiden (2010)
 Halo Legends (Orchestrations) (2009)
 Hundeleben (2009)
 Eine Bärenstarke Liebe (2008)
 Morgen, ihr Luschen! Der Ausbilder-Schmidt-Film (2008)
 Tell (2007)
 Save Angel Hope (2006)

Musicals

 VIVID Grand Show - Friedrichstadt-Palast Berlin (Arrangements) (2018)
 The One Grand Show - Friedrichstadt-Palast Berlin (Arrangements) (2016)
 Dällebach Kari – das Musical (2009/2010)

Game music

 Lineage W (2022)
 BlockStarParty (2017)
 Pastry Party (2015)
 Anno 2205 (Orchestrations) (2015)
 Kinect Rush (Orchestrations) (2012)
 Anno 1404 (Orchestrations) (2008)
 Black Prophecy (Orchestrations) (2007)

Concert works

 A Summer Night to Remember (2022), commissioned by WDR Funkhausorchester
 Violin Concerto (2010), recorded by Anna Karkowska and the London Symphony Orchestra
 Orchestrale Groove-Sektion (2008),for orchestra
 Valse misterieuse (2008), for orchestra
 Spheric Motion (2008), for big band
 Die Schöne Helena (2007), arrangements of the operette by Jacques Offenbach
 August der Starke (2007), for orchestra

Awards

 Gold Record - for Alex Christensen & The Berlin Orchestra - Classical 90s Dance Vol. 2 (2022)
 Venezia Shorts - Best Original Score - for A Father's Job (2021)
 Long Story Shorts International Film Festival - Best Original Score - for A Father's Job (2021)
 Hollywood Gold Awards - Best Original Score - for A Father's Job (2021)
 European Cinematography Awards (ECA) - Best Original Score - for A Father's Job (2021)
 Marina del Rey Film Festival - Best Score - for Hero (2017)

Notes

References
 Robin Hoffmann's Homepage
 
 Robin Hoffmann's Facebook Fan Page
 Robin Hoffmann on Twitter
Robin Hoffmann on SoundCloud

1984 births
People from Meissen
21st-century classical composers
German film score composers
Male film score composers
German male composers
German music arrangers
Living people
Hochschule für Musik Carl Maria von Weber alumni
21st-century German composers
21st-century German male musicians